Admiral Hillyar may refer to:

Charles Hillyar (1817–1888), British Royal Navy admiral
Henry Hillyar (1819–1893), British Royal Navy admiral
James Hillyar (1769–1843), British Royal Navy admiral